Southwest Minnesota Regional Airport or Marshall/Ryan Field  is a general aviation airport located 1 mile west of the central business district (CBD) of Marshall, Minnesota, United States. It is primarily a general aviation facility, though passenger air service did once exist on Midwest Aviation, also known as Lake State Airways. The namesake for Ryan Field is Matthew Ryan, commissioner of small airport around Minneapolis.

Facilities and aircraft

Facilities
The airport contains two asphalt paved runways: Runway 12/30 measuring 7221 x 100 ft (2201 x 30 m) and Runway 2/20 measuring 3999 x 75 ft (1219 x 23 m). This airport does not have an air traffic control tower.

Midwest Aviation provides fixed-base operations.

For the period ending 31 August 2010, the airport had 22,995 flights at an average of 63 per day. 66% general aviation (42% transient general aviation, 24% local), 34% air taxi and <1% military. For the year ending 31 December 2008, the airport had a total of 8 enplanements.

Aircraft
As of August 2010, there are 28 aircraft based on the field: 19 single-engine, 6 multi-engine, and 3 jet.

Cargo

Historical scheduled service 
In December 1972 Mississippi Valley Airlines scheduled service to Minneapolis–St. Paul International Airport and Willmar Municipal Airport.

Starting in the mid-1970s and continuing until the early 1980s, Lake State Airways operated Piper PA-31 Navajo aircraft on a route between Marshall and Minneapolis with stops in New Ulm and Saint Paul. The route was later expanded to originate in Sioux Falls, South Dakota.

References

External links

Airports in Minnesota
Buildings and structures in Lyon County, Minnesota
Transportation in Lyon County, Minnesota